512 (five hundred [and] twelve) is the natural number following 511 and preceding 513.

In mathematics 
512 is a power of two: 29 (2 to the 9th power) and the cube of 8: 83.

It is the eleventh Leyland number.

It is also the third Dudeney number.

It is a self number in base 12.

It is a harshad number in decimal.

It is the cube of the sum of its digits in base 10.

It is the number of directed graphs on 3 labeled nodes.

In computing 
512 bytes is a common disk sector size, and exactly a half of kibibyte.

Internet Relay Chat restricts the size of a message to 510 bytes, which fits to 512-bytes buffers when coupled with the message-separating CRLF sequence.

512 = 2·256 is the highest number of glyphs that the VGA character generator can use simultaneously.

In music 
Selena Quintanilla released a song titled El Chico del Apartamento 512 (the title referring to area code 512, which serves Austin, Texas), in 1995.

Lamb of God recorded a song titled "512" for their 2015 album VII: Sturm und Drang.

Mora and Jhay Cortez recorded a song titled "512" (The number 512 in this song refers to the Percocet 512 pill, a white, round pill whose active substances are acetaminophen and oxycodone hydrochloride) in February of 2021.

References

Integers